Dora Kim Moon (1877–1971) was a Korean-American community organizer. In March 2017, Hawaiʻi Magazine ranked her among a list of the most influential women in Hawaiian history.  After emigrating from Korea to the Territory of Hawaii, she formed a prayer group which later became the First Korean United Methodist Church. Also in Hawaii, Moon founded the Korean Women's Club, the Korean Missionary Society, and helped establish the Korean Women's Relief Society. According to the Hawai'i Council for the Humanities, she was a "pivotal organizer of a modern Korean women's movement in the Territory of Hawai‘i".

References

1877 births
1971 deaths
People of the Territory of Hawaii
American community activists
Korean emigrants to the United States
American people of Korean descent
19th-century American women
Organization founders
Women founders